Tetkino is an urban locality (an urban-type settlement) on the left bank of the Seym river in Glushkovsky District of Kursk Oblast, Russia. Population: 

It is on a small salient of Russian territory, with the Russia–Ukraine border running on the north-west, south-west and south-east of the settlement. To the south is Sumy Raion and to the north-west is Konotop Raion, both in the Sumy Oblast of Ukraine.

References

Urban-type settlements in Kursk Oblast